Ernest Paul Lehman (December 8, 1915 – July 2, 2005) was an American screenwriter and film producer. He was nominated six times for Academy Awards for his screenplays during his career, but did not win. At the 73rd Academy Awards in 2001, he received an Honorary Academy Award in recognition of his achievements and his influential works for the screen. He was the first screenwriter to receive that honor.

He received two Edgar Awards of the Mystery Writers of America for screenplays of suspense films he wrote for director Alfred Hitchcock:  North by Northwest (1959), his only original screenplay, and Family Plot (1976), one of numerous adaptations.

Early years
Lehman was born in 1915 to Gertrude (Thorn) and Paul E. Lehman. Their wealthy Jewish family was based on Long Island; they had suffered major financial losses during the Great Depression. Lehman attended the College of the City of New York (The City College of New York).

After graduation, he started working as a freelance writer. Lehman felt that freelancing was a "very nervous way to make a living", so he began writing copy for a publicity firm that focused on plays and celebrities. He drew from this experience for the screenplay of the film Sweet Smell of Success (1957), which he co-wrote with playwright Clifford Odets.

Lehman also published many short stories and novellas in magazines such as Colliers, Redbook and Cosmopolitan. These attracted the attention of Hollywood managers, and in the mid-1950s Paramount Pictures signed him to a writing contract. His first film, Executive Suite (1954), was a success.

Lehman was asked to collaborate on the romantic comedy Sabrina (1954), which was released the same year and also became a hit. Some of his most notable works are the screenplay adaptations of the musical West Side Story (1961) and the mega-hit film version of The Sound of Music (1965), another musical.

Amateur radio
Lehman held amateur radio callsign K6DXK.  He was an active member of the Bel Air Repeater Association.

Collaboration with Alfred Hitchcock
In 1958, Metro-Goldwyn-Mayer had hired Hitchcock to make a film called The Wreck of the Mary Deare, based on Hammond Innes' novel of the same name. Collaborating with Lehman, Hitchcock produced North by Northwest (1959) instead. This was one of Lehman's few original screenplays (rather than adaptations). The film starred Cary Grant as Roger O. Thornhill, a Madison Avenue advertising executive who is mistaken for a government agent by a group of menacing spies (led by James Mason and Martin Landau). Lehman later said he intended North by Northwest to be "the Hitchcock picture to end all Hitchcock pictures." The writing process took Lehman a year, including several periods of writer's block, as well as a trip to Mount Rushmore to do research for the film's climax.

North by Northwest was one of Lehman's greatest triumphs in Hollywood and a huge hit for Hitchcock.  For his efforts, Lehman received an Academy Award nomination for Best Original Screenplay, as well as a 1960 Edgar Award from the Mystery Writers of America for Best Motion Picture Screenplay.

Other projects
In addition to screenwriting, Lehman tried his hand at producing. He was among the few people who initially favored a film adaptation of Edward Albee's play Who's Afraid of Virginia Woolf?. He persuaded studio executive Jack L. Warner to allow him to take on the project, and the film was a critical sensation, garnering many Academy Award nominations. Lehman was also nominated for an Academy Award for producing Hello, Dolly! (1969), starring Barbra Streisand.

In 1972, Lehman directed Portnoy's Complaint, based on the novel by Philip Roth; this was his only directorial work. Later, he earned another Edgar Award for his screenplay for Alfred Hitchcock's final movie, Family Plot (1976).

By 1979, Lehman had stopped writing screenplays, aside from some television projects. He turned down offers to write for Jonathan Demme's The Silence of the Lambs and Brian De Palma's Mission: Impossible.  Lehman completed adaptations for two films that were never made: a screenplay for the Noël Coward classic Hay Fever, and one for a musical version of Zorba the Greek. The latter was intended for direction by Robert Wise and starring actors Anthony Quinn and John Travolta.

In 1977, Lehman published the bestselling novel The French Atlantic Affair, about a group of unemployed, middle-class Americans who hijack a French cruise ship for a $35 million ransom. It was adapted as a TV miniseries in 1979.

Death
Lehman died on July 2, 2005 at UCLA Medical Center after an apparent heart attack. He was buried at the Westwood Village Memorial Park Cemetery in Los Angeles.

Writing credits

Filmography

The Inside Story (story) (1948)
Executive Suite (1954)
Sabrina (with Billy Wilder & Samuel Taylor) (1954)
Somebody Up There Likes Me (1956)
The King and I (1956)
Sweet Smell of Success (with Clifford Odets) (1957) (also Story)
North by Northwest (1959)
From the Terrace (1960)
West Side Story (1961)
The Prize (1963)
The Sound of Music (1965)
Who's Afraid of Virginia Woolf? (1966)
Hello, Dolly! (1969)
Portnoy's Complaint (1972) (also Director)
Family Plot (1976)
Black Sunday (with Kenneth Ross and Ivan Moffat)  (1977)

Television 
The Chevrolet Tele-Theatre (Writer, 1 Episode) (1949)
The Ford Television Theatre (Writer, 1 Episode) (1954)
Lux Video Theatre (Writer, 1 Episode) (1955)
Playhouse 90 (Writer, 1 Episode) (1957)
TV de Vanguarda (Play, 1 Episode) (1957)
The French Atlantic Affair (Based on his novel) (1979)

Bibliography
Sweet Smell of Success: And Other Stories, short stories (1957)
The French Atlantic Affair, novel (1977)
Screening Sickness and Other Tales of Tinsel Town, essays (1982)
''Farewell Performance (novel) (1982)

Accolades
Lehman received six Academy Award nominations during his career, but never won. At the 73rd Academy Awards ceremony in 2001, he became the first screenwriter to receive an Honorary Academy Award from the Academy of Motion Picture Arts and Sciences. Lehman did, however, receive more honorable recognition from the Writers Guild of America than any other screenwriter in film history.

References

External links

Ernest Lehman Papers at the Harry Ransom Center

Ernest Lehman's North by Northwest shooting script
Ernest Lehman photograph by photographer/filmmaker Clay Walker

1915 births
2005 deaths
American male screenwriters
Burials at Westwood Village Memorial Park Cemetery
City College of New York alumni
Edgar Award winners
People from Long Island
Writers Guild of America Award winners
Academy Honorary Award recipients
Jewish American screenwriters
Screenwriters from New York (state)
Amateur radio people
20th-century American male writers
20th-century American screenwriters
20th-century American Jews
21st-century American Jews